Veľká Dolina is a village and municipality in the Nitra District of western central Slovakia, in the Nitra Region.

History
The village and municipality is a new settlement established in 1956.

Geography
The village lies at an altitude of 135 metres and covers an area of 11.686 km². It has a population of about 605 people.

Ethnicity
The population is about 99% Slovak.

References

External links
http://www.klubvd.sk - Official Club of Velka Dolina
https://web.archive.org/web/20080111223415/http://www.statistics.sk/mosmis/eng/run.html 

Villages and municipalities in Nitra District